General elections were held in Sweden in September 1902. The Free-minded National Association emerged as the largest party in the Riksdag, winning 107 of the 230 seats.

Results
Only 27.7% of the male population aged over 21 was eligible to vote. Voter turnout was 47.2%.

References

Sweden
General
General elections in Sweden
Sweden